The Federation of Businesses of the Congo is the main employers' organization in the Democratic Republic of the Congo. Established in 1997, it had 2, 700 members in 2010. It received financial support from the French Development Agency in 2010. Its president is Albert Yuma.

References

Business organisations based in the Democratic Republic of the Congo
Employers' organizations
Kinshasa